The 1933 Paris–Roubaix was the 34th edition of the Paris–Roubaix, a classic one-day cycle race in France. The single day event was held on 16 April 1933 and stretched  from Paris to its end in a velodrome in Roubaix. The winner was Sylvère Maes from Belgium.

Results

References

Paris–Roubaix
Paris–Roubaix
Paris–Roubaix
Paris–Roubaix